Meany is a surname. Notable people with the surname include:
Edmond S. Meany, American historian, politician, and Mountaineer
George Meany, American labor leader, first president of the AFL-CIO
Mary K. Meany (1897–2000), American educator and politician
Paul Meany, American musician
Bugs Meany, a recurring villain in the Encyclopedia Brown series of books

See also 
A Prayer for Owen Meany, a novel by John Irving
Meanie (disambiguation)
Blue Meanies (Yellow Submarine)
 Meaney